David Hawkes VC (1822 – 14 August 1858) was an English recipient of the Victoria Cross, the highest and most prestigious award for gallantry in the face of the enemy that can be awarded to British and Imperial forces.

Details
Hawkes was 35 years old, from Witham, Essex and a private in the 2nd Battalion, The Rifle Brigade (Prince Consort's Own), British Army during the Indian Mutiny when the following deed took place at the Siege of Lucknow for which he, Henry Wilmot and  William Nash were awarded the VC:

He was killed in action at Faizabad, British India, on 14 August 1858. As he was killed before he could hear news of the award of a VC (24 December 1858) it was decided to send his father William the award. His VC is located at The Fitzwilliam Museum in Cambridge.

References

 
 
 

1822 births
1858 deaths
Rifle Brigade soldiers
British recipients of the Victoria Cross
Indian Rebellion of 1857 recipients of the Victoria Cross
People from Witham
British military personnel killed in the Indian Rebellion of 1857
British Army recipients of the Victoria Cross
Military personnel from Essex